The Sorcerer's Apprentice is a symphonic poem by the French composer Paul Dukas, completed in 1897. Subtitled "Scherzo after a ballad by Goethe", the piece was based on Johann Wolfgang von Goethe's 1797 poem of the same name. By far the most performed and recorded of Dukas' works, its notable appearance in the Walt Disney 1940 animated film Fantasia has led to the piece becoming widely known to audiences outside the classical concert hall. Its first performance was given in Paris on May 18, 1897. The composer himself was its conductor.

Analysis

Description 
Inspired by the Goethe poem, Dukas's work is part of the larger Romantic genre of programmatic music, which composers like Franz Liszt, Claude Debussy, Jean Sibelius and Richard Strauss increasingly explored as an alternative to earlier symphonic forms. Unlike other tone poems, such as La mer by Debussy or Finlandia by Sibelius, Dukas's work is, like works such as Till Eulenspiegel's Merry Pranks by Strauss, descriptively programmatic, closely following the events described in the Goethe poem. It was customary, in fact, to publish the poem as part of the orchestral score.

Main musical motif

Instrumentation
The instrumentation of the piece consists of two flutes and piccolo, two oboes, two soprano clarinets and bass clarinet, three bassoons and contrabassoon (or contrabass sarrusophone), four horns, two trumpets (in C), two cornets, three trombones, timpani, glockenspiel, bass drum, cymbals, triangle, harp and strings. The formidable glockenspiel part is sometimes handled by a pianist playing a keyboard glockenspiel or celesta, but is usually played by a percussionist on a traditional glockenspiel making it a common orchestral excerpt for percussion auditions. Dukas also made a transcription for two pianos of this orchestral piece.

Transcriptions 
Linos Piano Trio transcribed the piece for piano trio for their 2021 album "Stolen Music".

Fantasia

Although The Sorcerer's Apprentice was already a popular concert piece, it was brought to a much larger audience through its inclusion, as one of eight animated shorts based on classical music, in the 1940 Walt Disney animated concert film Fantasia. In the film segment, also called “The Sorcerer’s Apprentice,” Mickey Mouse plays the role of the apprentice. Disney had acquired the music rights in 1937 when he planned to release a separate Mickey Mouse film, which, at the suggestion of Leopold Stokowski, was eventually expanded into Fantasia.

Other screen versions 
A decade prior to Fantasia, in 1930 Sidney Levee directed, Hugo Riesenfeld and William Cameron Menzies produced, and Joseph M. Schenck presented a series of four short films of classical music. One of the four, based on the Dukas music, was titled The Wizard's Apprentice; this short film has been released on DVD and shown on Classic Arts Showcase. In 1931, the Dukas piece was used in Study No. 8 by Oskar Fischinger.

References

External links
 

1897 compositions
Compositions about wizards
Compositions by Paul Dukas
Compositions in F minor
Music based on poems
Musical settings of poems by Johann Wolfgang von Goethe
Symphonic poems
Works based on The Sorcerer's Apprentice